Mel Purcell and Tim Wilkison were the defending champions but did not compete that year.

Alex Antonitsch and Balázs Taróczy won in the final 4–6, 6–3, 7–6 against Kevin Curren and Tomáš Šmíd.

Seeds

  Kevin Curren /  Tomáš Šmíd (final)
  Joakim Nyström /  Claudio Panatta (first round)
  Sergio Casal /  Javier Sánchez (first round)
  Niclas Kroon /  Peter Lundgren (first round)

Draw

External links
 CA-TennisTrophy Doubles draw

Doubles